Mark Timmons (born 10 May 1986) is a Gaelic footballer from County Laois. He has played up to and including senior level for his county.

He usually plays in defence for Laois and in 2003 was an integral part of the Laois team that won the All-Ireland Minor Football Championship title for the first time since 1997.

In 2004, he was part of the minor team which won the Leinster Minor Football Championship.

In 2006 and 2007, Timmons was part of the Laois team that won two successive Leinster U21 Football Championship titles.

At club level, Timmons usually lines out as a full back with Graiguecullen.

Timmons also has a little girl who was born the day he played in the U21 final 2007 against Cork.

References

1986 births
Living people
Graiguecullen Gaelic footballers
Laois inter-county Gaelic footballers